The 2017–18 Big Ten men's basketball season began with practices in October 2017, followed by the start of the 2017–18 NCAA Division I men's basketball season in November. The 2018 Big Ten tournament was held at Madison Square Garden in New York. Due to the Big East's use of that venue for the 2018 Big East tournament, the Big Ten tournament took place one week earlier than usual, ending the week before Selection Sunday. As a result, the conference season began on December 1, 2017 and concluded on February 25, 2018. Each team played one road game and one home conference game in the first week of December. With a win over Wisconsin on February 25, 2018, Michigan State clinched the outright Big Ten championship, their eighth under Tom Izzo.

The Big Ten tournament was held from February 28 through March 4, 2018 at Madison Square Garden. Michigan defeated Purdue to win its second consecutive tournament. As a result, the Wolverines received the conference's automatic bid to the NCAA tournament. Four Big Ten schools (Michigan, Michigan State, Ohio State, and Purdue) were invited to the NCAA tournament, the fewest Big Ten teams selected for the Tournament since 2008. Michigan was the National Runner-up, losing to Villanova in the NCAA championship game. Nebraska and Penn State received invitations to the National Invitation Tournament. Penn State won the NIT championship.

Ohio State forward Keita Bates-Diop was named Big Ten Player of the Year. Ohio State head coach Chris Holtmann was named Big Ten Coach of the Year. Bates-Diop and Michigan State forward Miles Bridges were consensus All-Americans, while Purdue guard Carsen Edwards earned second and third team All-American recognition. Edwards won the Jerry West Award.

The season also marked the last time the conference played an 18-game conference schedule. The 2018–19 season marked the first time in Big Ten history that the teams will play a 20-game conference schedule.

Head coaches

Coaching changes
On March 11, 2017, Illinois fired head coach John Groce. On March 18, the school hired Brad Underwood as the new head coach.

On March 16, 2017, Indiana fired Tom Crean after nine years as head coach. On March 25, 2017, the school hired Archie Miller as head coach.

On June 5, 2017, Ohio State announced that head coach Thad Matta would not return as head coach after 13 years in Columbus. On June 9, the school hired Chris Holtmann as head coach.

Coaches

Notes: 
 All records, appearances, titles, etc. are from time with current school only. 
 Year at school includes 2017–18 season.
 Overall and Big Ten records are from time at current school and are through the end of the season. 
 Turgeon's ACC conference record excluded since Maryland began Big Ten Conference play in 2014–15.

Preseason

Preseason All-Big Ten 
Prior to the conference's annual media day, unofficial awards and a poll were chosen by a panel of 28 writers, two for each team in the conference. Michigan State was a unanimous selection to win the conference, receiving all 28 votes. The Spartans' Miles Bridges was also a unanimous selection for Preseason Player of the Year.

Preseason conference poll

Preseason All-Big Ten 
On October 19, 2017, a panel of conference media selected a 10-member preseason All-Big Ten Team and Player of the Year.

Preseason watchlists
Below is a table of notable preseason watch lists.

Preseason national polls

Regular season

Rankings

Player of the week
Throughout the conference regular season, the Big Ten offices named one or two players of the week and one or two freshmen of the week each Monday.

Early season tournaments 
Eleven of the 14 Big Ten teams participated in early season tournaments. Each team's finish is noted below. Illinois, Indiana, and Rutgers did not participate in a tournament. Eight Big Ten teams participated in the Gavitt Tip-Off Games against Big East Conference teams for the third consecutive year. All Big Ten teams participated in the ACC–Big Ten Challenge against Atlantic Coast Conference teams, the 19th year for the event.

Conference matrix
This table summarizes the head-to-head results between teams in conference play. Each team played 18 conference games, and at least one game against each opponent.

Honors and awards
On January 9, 2018, Keita Bates-Diop was recognized as the Oscar Robertson National Player of the Week by the United States Basketball Writers Association. On January 15, Purdue was named NCAA.com team of the Week. On February 26, Carsen Edwards was named NCAA.com National Player of the Week.

All-Big Ten awards and teams
On February 26, 2018, the Big Ten announced most of its conference awards.

USBWA
On March 6, the U.S. Basketball Writers Association released its 2017–18 Men's All-District Teams, based upon voting from its national membership. There were nine regions from coast to coast, and a player and coach of the year were selected in each. The following lists all the Big Ten representatives selected within their respective regions.

District II (NY, NJ, DE, DC, PA, WV)
Tony Carr, Penn State

District III (VA, NC, SC, MD)
none

District V (OH, IN, IL, MI, MN, WI)
Player of the Year
Keita Bates-Diop, Ohio State
Coach of the Year
Chris Holtmann, Ohio State
All-District Team
Keita Bates-Diop, Ohio State
Miles Bridges, Michigan State
Carsen Edwards, Purdue
Vincent Edwards, Purdue
Ethan Happ, Wisconsin
Juwan Morgan, Indiana
Moritz Wagner, Michigan
Cassius Winston, Michigan State

District VI (IA, MO, KS, OK, NE, ND, SD)
James Palmer Jr., Nebraska

NABC
The National Association of Basketball Coaches announced their Division I All-District teams on March 13, recognizing the nation's best men's collegiate basketball student-athletes. Selected and voted on by member coaches of the NABC, the selections on this list were then eligible for NABC Coaches' All-America Honors. The following list represented the District 7 players chosen to the list.

First Team
Keita Bates-Diop, Ohio State
Miles Bridges, Michigan State
Carsen Edwards, Purdue
James Palmer Jr., Nebraska
Tony Carr, Penn State

Second Team
Moritz Wagner, Michigan
Vincent Edwards, Purdue
Ethan Happ, Wisconsin
Isaac Haas,	Purdue
Juwan Morgan, Indiana

Other awards
Keita Bates-Diop (1st team), Miles Bridges (2nd team)  were selected as consensus 2018 All-American and Carsen Edwards earned several All- American recognitions. Edwards won the Jerry West Award.

Postseason

Big Ten tournament

* denotes overtime period

NCAA tournament

The winner of the Big Ten tournament, Michigan, received the conference's automatic bid to the 2018 NCAA Division I men's basketball tournament.

National Invitation tournament
Two Big Ten teams received invitations to the National Invitation Tournament: Nebraska and Penn State. Penn State won the championship.

2018 NBA draft

The following All-Big Ten selections were listed as seniors: Ohio State's Jae'Sean Tate, Purdue's Vincent Edwards and Isaac Haas. Additionally, Michigan State's Miles Bridges and Jaren Jackson Jr. announced that they would enter the draft and sign with an agent. Penn State's Tony Carr also announced he would enter the draft and sign with and agent. Moritz Wagner hired an agent. Several other players announced that they would test the draft process, but did not hire an agent, including Wisconsin's Ethan Happ, Purdue's Carsen Edwards, Nebraska's James Palmer Jr., Michigan State's Nick Ward, Michigan's Charles Matthews, and Indiana's Juwan Morgan. These players all withdrew from the draft and returned to school.

Four 2017–18 Big Ten Conference men's basketball season players were drafted in the first round of the 2018 draft (Jaren Jackson Jr. — 4th, Bridges — 12th, Kevin Huerter — 19th, Wagner — 25th) and eight were drafted overall in the draft (Justin Jackson — 43rd, Bates-Diop — 48th, Carr — 51st, Edwards — 52nd).

References